STS-36 was a NASA Space Shuttle mission, during which Space Shuttle Atlantis carried a classified payload for the U.S. Department of Defense (DoD) (believed to have been a Misty reconnaissance satellite) into orbit. STS-36 was the 34th shuttle mission overall, the sixth flight for Atlantis, and the fourth night launch of the shuttle program. It launched from Kennedy Space Center, Florida, on February 28, 1990, and landed on March 4, 1990.

Crew

Crew seating arrangements

Mission summary 

Atlantis launched on the STS-36 mission on February 28, 1990, at 2:50:22 EST. The launch was originally set for February 22, 1990, but was postponed repeatedly due to the illness of the crew commander and poor weather conditions. This was the first time since Apollo 13 in 1970 that a crewed space mission was affected by the illness of a crew member. The first rescheduled launch attempt, set for February 25, 1990, was scrubbed due to a range safety computer malfunction. Another attempt, set for February 26, 1990, was scrubbed due to weather conditions. The successful launch on February 28, 1990, was set for a classified launch window, lying within a launch period extending from 00:00 to 04:00 EST. The launch weight for this mission was classified.

The launch trajectory was unique to this flight, and allowed the mission to reach an orbital inclination of 62.00°, the deployment orbit of its payload — the normal maximum inclination for a shuttle flight was 57.00°. This so-called "dog-leg" trajectory saw Atlantis fly downrange on a normal launch azimuth, and then maneuver to a higher launch azimuth once out over the water. Although the maneuver resulted in a reduction of vehicle performance, it was the only way to reach the required deployment orbit from Kennedy Space Center (originally, the flight had been slated to launch from Vandenberg Air Force Base in California, until the shuttle launch facilities there were mothballed in 1989). Flight rules that prohibited overflight of land were suspended, with the trajectory taking the vehicle over or near Cape Hatteras, Cape Cod, and parts of Canada. The payload was considered to be of importance to national security, hence the suspension of normal flight rules.

As a Department of Defense operation, STS-36's payload remains officially classified. STS-36 launched a single satellite, also described as AFP-731. Other objects (1990-019C-G) reportedly appeared in orbit following its deployment.

It was reported that USA-53 was an Advanced KH-11 photo-reconnaissance satellite, using an all-digital imaging system to return pictures. KH-11 satellites are believed to resemble the Hubble Space Telescope in size and shape, as the satellites were shipped in similar containers, and had comparable primary mirror diameters. USA-53, nicknamed "Misty", was tracked briefly by amateur satellite observers in October and November 1990.

The mission marked another flight of an  human skull, which served as the primary element of "Detailed Secondary Objective 469", also known as the In-flight Radiation Dose Distribution (IDRD) experiment. This joint NASA/DoD experiment was designed to examine the penetration of radiation into the human cranium during spaceflight. The female skull was seated in a plastic matrix, representative of tissue, and sliced into ten layers. Hundreds of thermo-luminescent dosimeters were mounted in the skull's layers to record radiation levels at multiple depths. This experiment, which also flew on STS-28 and STS-31, was located in the shuttle's mid-deck lockers on all three flights, recording radiation levels at different orbital inclinations.

Atlantis landed at 10:08:04 PST on March 4, 1990, at Edwards Air Force Base, California, on runway 23 ending the STS-36. Atlantis was towed to the 
Mate-Demate Device by around 15:00 PST.

About 62 impacts in the shuttle's Thermal Protection System (TPS) tiles were counted by the debris team after the mission. Tile engineers reported that only one tile required replacement. The brakes and tires performed nominally. Drops of hydraulic fluid were observed in the right main landing gear wheel well, the liquid hydrogen  disconnect cavity and possibly around two of the main engines.

Mission insignia 
The thirty-six stars on the insignia symbolize the flight's numerical designation in the Space Transportation System's mission sequence; the stars also form part of a stylized American flag, forming the background to an image of a bald eagle, the American national bird.

See also 

 List of human spaceflights
 List of Space Shuttle missions

References

External links 
 STS-36 Video Highlights  – NSS.org
 STS-36 Mission Summary  – NASA.gov

Space Shuttle missions
Edwards Air Force Base
Spacecraft launched in 1990
Department of Defense Space Shuttle missions